The 2008 World Outdoor Bowls Championship men's fours was held at the Burnside Bowling Club in Christchurch, New Zealand, from 12 to 24 January 2008.

Andrew Todd, Richard Girvan, Russell Meyer and Gary Lawson won the men's fours gold medal.

Section tables

Section A

Section B

Finals

Results

References

Men